Andres Koort (born 17 May 1969) is an Estonian painter, scenographer, exhibit designer and curator. He is a member of the Estonian Artists' Association and member of the board of the Estonian Painters' Association since 2002 and has curated and designed some EPA's exhibitions.

Biography
Koort was born 17 May 1969 in Tallinn. He studied stage design and painting 1987–1993 in Estonian Academy of Art. Later he studied painting in Academie Minerva, Netherlands (1991). Andres Koort is a great-grandson of the sculptor Jaan Koort.

Works
Andres Koort has been exhibiting his paintings since 1991, from 2002 he has designed stages for theatres Estonian Drama Theatre, Tallinn City Theatre, the Estonian Puppet Theatre, Theatrum (all in Tallinn) and Endla Theatre (in Pärnu).
Tartu Art Museum and Lithuanian Art Museum have some Koort's works in their collections.

Personal exhibitions
2010 "Past continius" Tam gallery
2009 "Constantly" e-exhibition
2009 "Constantly" Draakoni gallery, Tallinn
2009 "Constantly" Estonian embassy, Moscow
2009 "Constantly" KU Gallery
2009 "The Field Was a Sea" Pärnu Town gallery
2008 "Constantly" Pärnu Endla theatre gallery 
2001 "Synchronised" Tallinn City gallery 
2000 "Horizon" Haapsalu town gallery
2000 "Up and Down" Raatuse gallery, Tallinn
1999 "Stridberg’s DNA" Pärnu Endla theatre gallery
1999 "Closer to the earth" Tallinn City gallery
1997 "Paintings" Sammas gallery, Tallinn
1995 "Seven Heads" Gallery Kauno Langas, Lithuania
1994 "Visitor" Estonian National Library, Tallinn
1993 "Aino" Tallinn's Mustpeade maja gallery
1991 "Deep" Gallery Illegaard, Tartu

Group exhibitions
2009 "Painted message vol.2" Tartu Art museum
2009 "Constantly Onetwo" Narva Art museum gallery
2009 "Freestyle" Võru town gallery
2008 "XL" EPA year exhibition, Tartu Art museum
2008 "PEA" Rakvere theatre gallery
2008 "Waking!" EML year exhibition, Rotermann Salt Storage, Tallinn
2008 "Crossing the line" EPA year exhibition, Narva Art museum gallery 
2007 "the Right Choice" EPA year exhibition, Tartu Art Museum
2007 "Bland Painting" EPA year exhibition, Haapsalu town gallery 
2006 "Free Willie!" EPA year exhibition, Vaal gallery, Tallinn
2006 "Beautiful paintings" EPA year exhibition, Aaspere mansion
2005 "in the United line" EPA year exhibition, Tartu Art museum
2005 "Hyper exhibition" Sakala 9, Tallinn 
2004 "Three rooms, bathroom and a corridor" Sakala 9, Tallinn 
2004 "P.E.A. sixth" Kärdla gallery
2003 "Painting paradise" EPA year exhibition, Gallery 008, Tallinn
2003 "Pause" gallery Arka, Vilnius, Lithuania
2003 "I’ve been to New York" EPA year exhibition, Pärnu Town gallery
2003 "Hiiu Sign" Kärdla Gallery 
2002 "IN Graafika" Pärnu town gallery
2002 "Another Seascape" Palanga, Lithuania
2001 "Seaside Romanss" Palanga, Lithuania
2001 "Sidestep" Pärnu town gallery
2001 "P.E.A. Facade" Raatuse gallery, Tallinn
2001 "P.E.A." Haapsalu town gallery
1998 "Three squared" Pärnu town gallery
1992 Painting exhibition Tartu University Library
1992 Autumn exhibition Tallinn Arthall

Stage designs
1990 The Bourgeois Gentleman (Molière) Estonian Dramatheatre
1996 The Bitter Tears of Petra von Kant (R.W.Fassbinder) Tallinn City Theatre
1999 Hades (A. Strindberg) Pärnu theatre "Endla"
2000 Stairway to heaven Estonian Puppet theatre
2001 Vader (G.Görgey) Theatrum
2005 In front of the Jewelry store (K.Wojtyla) Theatrum
2007 Coctail Party (T.S.Eliot) Theatrum
2008 "The Tidings Brought to Mary" (P.Claudel) Theatrum

Gallery

References

External links

 The artist's personal homepage
 e-exhibition Constantly

1969 births
Living people
20th-century Estonian painters
21st-century Estonian painters
20th-century Estonian male artists
21st-century Estonian male artists
Artists from Tallinn